Conrado del Campo y Zabaleta (28 October 1878 – 17 March 1953) was a Spanish composer, violinist and pedagogue.

Career
Del Campo was born in Madrid and became professor at the Real Conservatorio de Música in Madrid in 1915, where he was an especially influential teacher. Among his pupils were Salvador Bacarisse, Julián Bautista, and Fernando Remacha. 

His compositions were played in the Theatre Real of Madrid for José María Alvira. His opera Lola la Piconera made its debut at the Gran Teatre del Liceu, Barcelona, 12 December 1952. He was also the principal conductor of the Madrid Symphony Orchestra.

Del Campo was a major figure in the conservative musical climate of Franco's Spain, writing in a late Romantic style. Since his death his music has fallen into comparative oblivion.

He died in Madrid aged 74.

Selected works

Symphonic works
Del Campo's characteristic symphonic music takes the form of evocative tone poems.
 Ante las ruinas (Before the Ruins, 1898) 
 La dama de Amboto (The Lady of Amboto, 1901)
 Two Parts from the Divina Commedia Prologue (1908)
 Inferno (1910)
 Bocetos castellanos (Castilian Sketches, 1911)
 Granada, a symphonic poem (1913)
 Fantasía sobre temas del Maestro Chapí (Fantasy on themes of Master Chapi, 1913)
 Kásida (1922)
 Obertura madrileña, a concert overture (1930)
 Suite madrileña (1934)
 Ofrenda a los caídos (Offering to the Fallen, 1944)
 Poema de Castilla (Castilian Poem, 1948)
 Poema de las Cantigas (Poem of the Songs, before 1950)
 Poema de la Natividad (Poem of the Nativity, before 1950)
 Evocación y nostalgia de los molinos de viento (Evocation and Nostalgia of Windmills, 1952)

Concertante works
 Fantasía castellana, for piano and orchestra (1939)
 Suite for viola and small orchestra (1940)
 Violin Concerto (1943)
 Evocación de Castilla for piano and orchestra (1943)
 Cello Concerto (1944)
 Evocación y nostalgia de los molinos de viento Tríptico castellano El viento de Castilla Poema de los loores de María, symphonic poem for viola and orchestra (1944)

Chamber music
 Romanza in F major for viola and piano, Op. 5 (1901)
 Pequeña pieza for viola and piano, Op. 6 (1906)
 String Quartet No. 1 in D minor, Oriental (1903)
 String Quartet No. 2 in A major, A buen juez mejor testigo (1907)
 String Quartet No. 3 in C minor, Cuarteto castellano (1908)
 String Quartet No. 4 in C major, El Christo de la Vega, Musical commentary to Zorrilla's poem, divided into six impressions. (with spoken word)
 String Quartet No. 5 in F minor, Caprichos Románticos (1908)
 String Quartet No. 6 in B minor, Asturian (1909)
 String Quartet No. 7 in E minor (1911)
 String Quartet No. 8 in E major (1913)
 String Quartet No. 9 in D major, Apassionado (1942)
 String Quartet No. 10 in F major, Castilian (1945)
 String Quartet No. 11 in E major (1947)
 String Quartet No. 12 in B flat major (1948)
 String Quartet No. 13 in A major, Carlos III (1949)
 String Quartet No. 14 in D major (1952)
 Piano Quintet in E major, Episodio de una vida combatida y dolorosa (1939; adaptation of String Quartet No. 8)

Piano Music
 León Danza del Bufón (based on a poem by Castilla)

Zarzuelas
 Aires de la Sierra El burlador de ToledoChoral works
 Castilla El viento de Fuensaldaña Seis canciones Castellanas'' ("Six Castilian songs")

Sources
Antonio Iglesias, Monografia Nº 4: Conrado del Campo, Orquesta y Coro de la Comunidad de Madrid (in Spanish). Accessed 28 October 2008.

References

1878 births
1953 deaths
19th-century Spanish male musicians
20th-century classical composers
20th-century conductors (music)
20th-century Spanish male musicians
Madrid Royal Conservatory alumni
Male conductors (music)
Male opera composers
Musicians from Madrid
Spanish classical composers
Spanish conductors (music)
Spanish male classical composers
Spanish opera composers
Spanish Romantic composers